The Memorial Community Church is a Baptist church in Plaistow, Newham, east London. Neo-Byzantine in style, it is grade II listed.

History
It was originally founded in 1871 as the Barking Road Tabernacle. This was in continuing debt until Robert Rowntree Clifford took over in 1897, reviving and transforming the church membership and clearing all the debts by 1900.  Growth led to the formation of West Ham Central Mission in 1904. This ran alongside the church until its present building opened in 1922. Designed by William Hayne, its construction had taken 15 months, costing about £60,000. It was constructed in the Byzantine style with a domed auditorium and two towers, and was dedicated to men from the local community and the congregation who had died in World War I, with the names of 169 such men cast into the bells in the east tower in 1925. The bells were cast by Gillett & Johnston. One bears the name of Prince Maurice of Battenberg, the only member of the British royal family killed in action in World War One, and one is dedicated to the Unknown Warrior.

In the New Year Honours of 1938, Robert Rowntree Clifford's wife, Hettie, received the OBE for her efforts as superintendent of the women's work of the Mission.

In 1978, a new trust deed changed the name of the Mission to Memorial Baptist Church Plaistow. The Memorial Community Church was formed in 2006 when the congregation of St Andrew's Church, Plaistow merged into the congregation of Memorial Baptist Church to form one group.

Further reading
Clifford, Paul Rowntree (1950), Venture in Faith: the Story of the West Ham Central Mission, Carey Kingsgate Press, ASIN B0000CHTRA. (Reprinted in 1952 ASIN B0007K1ZTS.)

References

External links
'West Ham: Roman Catholicism, Nonconformity and Judaism', in A History of the County of Essex: Volume 6, ed. W R Powell (London, 1973), pp. 123-141

Grade II listed churches in London
Baptist churches in the London Borough of Newham
Byzantine Revival architecture in the United Kingdom
Churches completed in 1922
20th-century Baptist churches in the United Kingdom
Grade II listed buildings in the London Borough of Newham
Plaistow, Newham